Samuel Drake (1687/8–1753) was an English Anglican clergyman and antiquary, and elder brother of Francis Drake. He proceeded M.A. at St. John's College, Cambridge, 1711, and D.D., 1724. He was rector of Treeton, Yorkshire, 1728–53, and vicar of Holme-on-Spalding Moor, 1733–53. He wrote on Christian ritual, and edited Bartholomew Clerke's Latin translation of Castiglione's Courtier, 1713.

Life 
He was baptised on 23 April 1688, the son of Francis Drake, vicar of Pontefract, and elder brother of the historian Francis Drake. His grandfather was Samuel Drake, the Anglican divine. He graduated at St. John's College, Cambridge: B.A. 1707, M.A. 1711, B.D. 1718, and D.D. 1724. In 1728 he became rector of Treeton, Yorkshire; and in 1733, by dispensation, he also held the vicarage of Holme-on-Spalding Moor. He died 5 March 1753, aged about sixty-seven years, and was buried in the church of Treeton. Drake has been confounded with his grandfather of the same name.

Works 
In 1713 he edited Balthazar Castilionis Comitis libri iv. de Curiali sive Aulico ex Italico sermone in Latinum conversi, interprete Bartholomæo Clerke, 8vo. In 1719 appeared Concio ad Clerum, Vino Eucharistico aqua non necessario admiscenda. Drake defended himself against a reply by Thomas Wagstaffe, the nonjuror, in Ad Thomam Wagstaffe … Epistola; in quâ defenditur Concio, 1721, 8vo. Wagstaffe published Responsionis ad Concionem Vindiciæ, &c., in 1725. In 1720 Drake (then a fellow of his college) issued proposals for printing Archbishop Parker's great work on ecclesiastical antiquities. The elder Bowyer undertook the work, and brought it out in a handsome folio in 1729, under the title of Matthæi Parker … de Antiquitate Britannicæ Ecclesiæ. In 1724 Drake published another Concio, entitled Ara ignoto Deo Sacra, Cambridge, 4to.

References

Sources 

 Nichols, John, ed. (1812). Literary Anecdotes of the Eighteenth Century. Vol. 1. London: Nichols, Son, and Bentley. pp. 171, 193, 204, 243, 414, 420–1, 550.
 Westby-Gibson, John; Marchand, J. A. (2004). "Drake, Samuel (1687/8–1753), antiquary". Oxford Dictionary of National Biography. Oxford University Press. Retrieved 8 September 2022.

'''Attribution:
 

1680s births
1753 deaths
18th-century English Anglican priests
18th-century antiquarians
English antiquarians